Microcrambus polingi is a moth in the family Crambidae. It was described by William D. Kearfott in 1908. It is found in the US state of Arizona.

References

Crambini
Moths described in 1908
Moths of North America